The Bulwarks, Porthkerry is a promontory fort in Rhoose, Vale of Glamorgan, on the southern coast of Wales overlooking the Bristol Channel.
It probably dates to the Iron Age and continued to be occupied during the Roman period in Britain. 
The ramparts and ditches along the west side are well preserved, but the fortifications are heavily overgrown.

Location

The Iron Age fortification is one of several along the southern coast of Wales.
The site was a strategically important position overlooking the Bristol Channel.
The fort is on the end of a spur that faces west and overlooked the Porthkerry creek, now silted up.
The natural slopes are very steep on the south east and north, but the ground is almost level towards the west.
The south side is now bounded by the edge of the cliff along the shore, but probably there was originally a fortification along this side, since eroded away.
The fort is accessible via the Porthkerry caravan park.

Fortification

The Bulwarks enclosure is trapezoidal in shape.
The cliff bounding the fort today has a recession rate of  annually.

The defence consisted of three close-set banks separated by ditches.
On the other two sides only terraces remain where the defences once ran.
The fort appears to have had just one entrance in the middle of the west side, at a slightly oblique angle to the rampart line, with gaps in the ramparts and causeways across the ditches.

History

Limited excavations indicate that the Bulwarks fort was occupied from the Iron Age into the Roman era.
The camp was probably first occupied around 200 BC to 75 AD, before the Romans arrived in South Wales.
Of the pottery remains from the military and then civilian occupation of the site, 26.7% is South-East Dorset Black Burnished Category I Pottery.

In 1968 F. L. Davies excavated the site for the Department of the Environment.
He found traces of three rectangular buildings just inside the innermost west rampart.
Of these successive timber buildings, the earliest may have been pre-Roman.
The second was occupied from the late first century AD to the mid second century AD, then burned down.
The third building seems to have been occupied until the late third century or the fourth century AD.

The defensive walls are now covered in thick vegetation.
The fort is scheduled as an ancient monument by the Ministry of Public Building and Works.

Notes

Sources

External links
 

Hillforts in the Vale of Glamorgan
Scheduled monuments in Wales